Shiloh Primitive Baptist Church is a historic rural African-American Primitive Baptist church located near Brogden, Johnston County, North Carolina.  It was built about 1920, and is a vernacular one-story, gable-front, three-bay, light timber-frame building.  The building was also used as a one-room school until the early 1930s. Also on the property is a contributing church cemetery with burials dating from the 1910 to 1987.

It was listed on the National Register of Historic Places in 2008.

References

One-room schoolhouses in North Carolina
African-American history of North Carolina
Baptist churches in North Carolina
Churches on the National Register of Historic Places in North Carolina
Churches completed in 1920
Churches in Johnston County, North Carolina
National Register of Historic Places in Johnston County, North Carolina
Primitive Baptists